Tancrède is an opera by André Campra.

Tancrède may also refer to:
 Tancrède de Hauteville (980–1041), an eleventh-century  Norman petty lord
 Tancrède Dumas (1830–1905), an Italian photographer
 Tancrède Auguste (1856–1913), 20th President of Haiti
 Tancrède Synave (1870–1936), a French painter
 Tancrède Labbé (1887–1956), a prominent Quebec politician and businessman
 Tancrède Vallerey (1892–1974), a French  writer
 Tancrède (French singer), a French contemporary singer
 Tancrède Melet (1983–2016), a French slackliner
 Tancrède (tragedy), a play by Voltaire
 Tancrède (1862), a French aviso

See also 
 Tancred (name)
 Tancred (disambiguation)
 Tancredi (disambiguation)
 Tancredo (disambiguation)